Come Swing with Me! is an album by American singer Frank Sinatra, released in 1961.

The album is Sinatra's final swing session with Capitol Records, as his next album, Point of No Return, would be composed mainly of torch songs. In 1971 it was re-issued as a ten-track album under the name Sentimental Journey. This album is possibly unique for the orchestral arrangement and stereophonic set-up by Billy May. Due to Capitol's signature "full-spectrum Stereo sound," the audience can distinctly hear the placement of specific orchestral pieces in the studio at the time of the recording (i.e., differences in brass sections from left, to right, to all together in the center).  This is most apparent to the apt listener in the album's opening hit, "Day by Day".

Track listing
"Day by Day" (Axel Stordahl, Paul Weston, Sammy Cahn) – 2:39
"Sentimental Journey" (Les Brown, Ben Homer, Bud Green)* – 3:26
"Almost Like Being in Love" (Frederick Loewe, Alan Jay Lerner) – 2:02
"Five Minutes More" (Cahn, Jule Styne) – 2:36
"American Beauty Rose" (Mack David, Redd Evans, Arthur Altman)* – 2:22
"Yes Indeed!" (Sy Oliver) – 2:35
"On the Sunny Side of the Street" (Jimmy McHugh, Dorothy Fields) – 2:42
"Don't Take Your Love from Me" (Henry Nemo)* – 1:59
"That Old Black Magic" (Harold Arlen, Johnny Mercer)* – 4:05
"Lover" (Richard Rodgers, Lorenz Hart)* – 1:53
"Paper Doll" (Johnny S. Black) – 2:08
"I've Heard That Song Before" (Cahn, Styne) – 2:33
 Bonus tracks not included on the original 1961 release:
"I Love You" (Harlan Thompson, Harry Archer) – 2:28
"Why Should I Cry Over You" (N. Miller, C. Conn)** – 2:42
"How Could You Do a Thing Like That to Me" (T. Glenn, A. Roberts)** – 2:44
"River, Stay 'Way From My Door" (Harry M. Woods, Mort Dixon)** – 2:38
"I Gotta Right to Sing the Blues" (Arlen, Ted Koehler)† – 2:59

Arranged and conducted by Billy May
*Arranged by Heinie Beau, conducted by Billy May
**Arranged and conducted by Nelson Riddle
†Arranged and conducted by Skip Martin

References

Frank Sinatra albums
1961 albums
Albums arranged by Billy May
Albums produced by Dave Cavanaugh
Capitol Records albums
Albums conducted by Billy May
Albums arranged by Heinie Beau
Albums recorded at Capitol Studios